Elena Mikhaylovna Nikolaeva (1936–2011) was a Soviet and Russian poet and translator. An alumnus of Petrozavodsk State University, she was a member of the Union of Soviet Writers.

Awards 
 Honoured Cultural Worker of the USSR

External links
 Памяти Елены Николаевой
 Чтоб осталась память навсегда

1936 births
2011 deaths
Russian women poets
Soviet women poets
Soviet poets
21st-century Russian poets
21st-century Russian women writers